Lana du Pont (born July 6, 1939) is an American equestrian. She competed in two events at the 1964 Summer Olympics. She was the first woman to take part in three-day eventing at the Olympics.

References

External links
 

1939 births
Living people
American female equestrians
Olympic equestrians of the United States
Equestrians at the 1964 Summer Olympics
Sportspeople from Philadelphia
21st-century American women